Robert Joseph Gladieux (born January 2, 1947) is a former American football running back in the American Football League and National Football League who played for the Boston Patriots, Buffalo Bills and New England Patriots. He played college football for the Notre Dame Fighting Irish. He also played in the World Football League for the New York Stars.

References

1947 births
Living people
American football running backs
Boston Patriots players
Buffalo Bills players
New England Patriots players
New York Stars players
Notre Dame Fighting Irish football players